Mackinac or Mackinaw may refer to:

Geography

Landforms
 Straits of Mackinac, a waterway in the U.S. state of Michigan connecting two of the Great Lakes, Lake Michigan and Lake Huron and separating the Upper and Lower Peninsulas of Michigan
 Mackinac Island, an island in the Straits of Mackinac
 Mackinaw River, a tributary of the Illinois River in the U.S. state of Illinois
 Little Mackinaw River, a tributary of the Mackinaw River

Populated areas
 Mackinac County, Michigan
 Mackinac Island, Michigan, the city on Mackinac Island
 Mackinaw Township, Michigan, in Cheboygan County
 Mackinaw City, Michigan, a village in Mackinaw Township
 Mackinaw Township, Tazewell County, Illinois
 Mackinaw, Illinois, a village in Mackinaw Township
 Little Mackinaw Township, Tazewell County, Illinois
 Mackinaw Historic District, a historic residential area in Franklin, Ohio

Structures and places
 Mackinac Bridge, a bridge over the Straits of Mackinac
 Old Mackinac Point Lighthouse, a lighthouse in Mackinaw City
 Fort Mackinac, a British, later American, fort on Mackinac Island
 Mackinac Island State Park, a state park on Mackinac Island
 Straits of Mackinac Shipwreck Preserve, a state-designated preservation area within much of the Straits of Mackinac
 Mackinac Wilderness, a designated area within the Hiawatha National Forest in Mackinac County, Michigan
 Mackinac Trail (or Mackinaw Trail), two related, but separate, roadways in Michigan
 Mackinac Trail – Carp River Bridge, a bridge along the Mackinac Trail over the Carp River in Mackinac County
 Mackinaw State Forest, a state-owned forested area in the northern Lower Peninsula of Michigan
 Mackinaw River State Fish and Wildlife Area, a state park in Tazewell County, Illinois, bisected by the Mackinaw River

Corporations and organizations
 Mackinac Island State Park Commission, an appointed board that administers state parklands in the Straits of Mackinac area
 Mackinac Transportation Company, a train ferry service that shuttled railroad cars across the Straits of Mackinac from 1882 until 1984
 Cincinnati, Jackson and Mackinaw Railroad, a railroad that formerly operated in Ohio and Michigan 
 Detroit and Mackinac Railway, a railroad that formerly operated in Michigan
 Mackinac Center for Public Policy, a research and educational organization advocating free-market policies
 Mackinac Financial Corporation, a bank holding company

Ships
 USCGC Mackinac, several ships of the United States Coast Guard
 USCGC Mackinaw, several ships of the United States Coast Guard
 USRC Mackinac (1903) or USCGC Mackinac, a patrol boat
 USS Mackinac, several ships of the United States Navy
 USS Mackinaw, a United States Navy gunboat commissioned twice between 1864 and 1867

Sailing
 Mackinaw boat, a type of small sailboat used in the Upper Great Lakes
 Port Huron to Mackinac Boat Race
 Chicago Yacht Club Race to Mackinac

Other uses
 Mackinaw cloth, a heavy and dense water-repellent woolen cloth
 Mackinaw jacket, a short double-breasted wool coat
 Mackinaw trout or Lake trout
 Mackinac Rendezvous, an annual Boy Scouts of America event held in the Straits of Mackinac area
 Mackinac Republican Leadership Conference (also known as the Midwest Mackinac Republican Leadership Conference), a biannual political conference held on Mackinac Island
 Mackinac Policy Conference, an annual political and economic conference held on Mackinac Island
 Mackinac Island meteorite, a meteorite found on the planet Mars by the Opportunity rover on October 13, 2009

See also
 Mackinawite, an iron nickel sulfide mineral
 Michilimackinac, a former term for the entire region around the Straits of Mackinac
 Fort Michilimackinac, a French, later British, fort and trading post on the northern tip of Michigan's Lower Peninsula at the Straits of Mackinac
 Mékinac (disambiguation)